The 2017–18 Women's Volleyball Thailand League  was the 13th season of the Thai League, the top Thai professional league for association volleyball clubs, since its establishment in 2005. Eight teams competed in the league. The season started on 4 September 2017.

Teams

Members

Arenas

Personnel and sponsoring

National team players

National team player quota regulation
National tram players who were active in 2017 international tournaments.
FIVB tournament: 2017 FIVB Volleyball World Grand Prix
AVC tournament: 2017 Asian Women's Volleyball Championship
Regional tournament: 2017 Southeast Asian Games
2018 FIVB Volleyball Women's World Championship qualification was not including in 2017 but will use in 2018.
Academic players will not including in national team player quota.

Foreign players

Tournament format
First round: single round-robin.
Second round: single round-robin.

Season standing procedure
 Number of matches won
 Match points
 Sets ratio
 Points ratio
 Result of the last match between the tied teams

Match won 3–0 or 3–1: 3 match points for the winner, 0 match points for the loser
Match won 3–2: 2 match points for the winner, 1 match point for the loser

League table

Standings

Results

Positions by round

First leg

Second leg

Final standing

Awards

Most Valuable Player
  Ajcharaporn Kongyot (Supreme Chonburi-E.Tech)
Most Valuable Foreign Player
  Sareea Freeman (Supreme Chonburi-E.Tech)
Best  Spiker
  Elisângela Oliveira (Khonkaen Star)
Best Outside Spiker
  Chatchu-on Moksri (Nakhon Ratchasima)
  Onuma Sittirak (Nakhon Ratchasima)
Best Middle Blocker
  Watchareeya Nualjam  (Supreme Chonburi-E.Tech)
  Hattaya Bamrungsuk (Nakhon Ratchasima)
Best Setter
  Soraya Phomla (Supreme Chonburi-E.Tech)
Best Opposite Spiker
  Malika Kanthong (Supreme Chonburi-E.Tech)
Best Libero
  Tapaphaipun Chaisri  (Khonkaen Star)

See also 
 2017–18 Men's Volleyball Thailand League

References

External links
 Official website

2017
2017 in women's volleyball
2018 in women's volleyball
volleyball
volleyball